Jai Prakash Narayan Singh  a leader of the Bharatiya Janata Party. He was elected to the Rajya Sabha from Jharkhand in 2008.

References 

1949 births
Living people
Rajya Sabha members from Jharkhand
People from Siwan district
People from Deoghar district
Bharatiya Janata Party politicians from Jharkhand